Ab Chendaran-e Tal Deraz (also Romanized as Āb Chendārān-e Tal Derāz; also known as Āb Chendār) is a village in Ludab Rural District, Ludab District, Boyer-Ahmad County, Kohgiluyeh and Boyer-Ahmad Province, Iran. At the 2006 census, its population was 214, in 36 families.

References 

Populated places in Boyer-Ahmad County